Antibody is a 2002 science fiction thriller film directed and edited by Christian McIntire that debuted as a Sci Fi Pictures TV-movie on the Sci Fi Channel on February 8, 2003.

Premise
A scientist (Lance Henriksen) leads a team in an experimental miniaturized craft injected into the bloodstream of a dying terrorist (Yulian Vergov) whose body conceals a computer chip that will trigger a nuclear explosion in the U.S. Capitol Building in less than 24 hours.

Cast
 Lance Henriksen as Dr. Richard Gaines
 Robin Givens as Rachel Saverini
 William Zabka as Emmerich
 Gaston Pauls as Pacio
 Yulian Vergov as Anthony Moran
 Teodora Duhovnikova as Trechak
 Stella Ivanova as Amanda
 Kathleen Randazzo as Nancy Pearson
 Velizar Binev as Dr. Bickell
 Yulian Vergov as Moran
 Christian McIntire as Agent Roth

See also 
 List of films featuring miniature people
 Fantastic Voyage
 Honey, I Shrunk the Kids (franchise)
 The Incredible Shrinking Man
 Innerspace

References

External links 
 

2000s science fiction thriller films
American science fiction thriller films
2003 films
Films about terrorism
Syfy original films
2000s English-language films
Films about size change
Films with screenplays by Jeffrey Boam
Human body in popular culture
Films directed by Christian McIntire
2000s American films